Originating as a birthday celebration, Santa Barbara, California's Summer Solstice Parade began in 1974.  This parade was created by Michael Gonzalez, a Santa Barbara resident and a mime and artist. The parade is the largest single-day event in Santa Barbara County, attracting crowds of 100,000 people or more. Weeks prior to the day of the parade, a workshop is opened where participating artists and technicians work with the community to conceive ideas, build floats, make costumes, and put their performances together.

History
In 1974, artist and mime, Michael Gonzalez gathered some of his street performer friends to dance down State Street in Santa Barbara, California, in celebration of his birthday and their gay pride.  Each year the parade grew until this annual event encompassed street fairs, concerts, theatre performances, floats, costumes, and dancing ensembles.

The parade went on hiatus in 2020 and restarted in 2022.

Controversy
Because of an outlandish ensemble many years ago which featured a sexual bondage theme, guidelines and regulations for all floats and participants in the Solstice Parade since have been strictly enforced. There can be no words, symbols, or nudity, floats must be people-powered, and "cannot represent physical harm to any human being. The representation of blood (fake or otherwise), dominance/violence, and or sadmasochistic behavior is inappropriate ... whips, guns, knives, or weapons of any kind, or props intended to represent weapons of any kind are prohibited."

See also
Fremont Solstice Parade
Bohemianism
Culture jamming

References

Tourist attractions in Santa Barbara, California
Festivals in California